Henry Edward Lilley (1868 – 30 August 1900) was an English international footballer. Born in Staveley, he played his league football as a left back for Sheffield United.

Career

Club career
Lilley started his career playing for his home-town club of Staveley before he was signed by Sheffield United in the summer of 1890. He played regularly for the Blades for two seasons but once they were elected to the Football League his appearances became less frequent. He remained with the club for another two seasons although became prone to knee injuries and was released in 1894. Shortly after his death in 1900 a writer in the Sheffield Daily Telegraph issue of 28 September 1900 commented on him being a "very fine and scrupulously fair back."

International career
Along with fellow United player Michael Whitham, Lilley was selected for an international trial in February 1892 and made his one and only appearance for England the following month against Wales.

Personal life
He was not well during the last few months of his life, losing sight in one eye because of an accident at Christmastime 1899, and suffering from consumption, and effects of an abdominal injury suffered late in his playing career. 
Lilley was the brother of goalkeeper and fellow Sheffield United player Will Lilley.

Honours
Sheffield United
Football League Division Two
Runner-up: 1892–93

References

External links

1868 births
1900 deaths
People from Staveley, Derbyshire
Footballers from Derbyshire
English footballers
Association football defenders
England international footballers
English Football League players
Staveley F.C. players
Sheffield United F.C. players
Midland Football League players
Northern Football League players
19th-century deaths from tuberculosis
Tuberculosis deaths in England